Shek Mun Kap is a village in the Tung Chung area of Lantau Island, Hong Kong.

Administration
Shek Mun Kap is a recognized village under the New Territories Small House Policy.

References

External links

 Delineation of area of existing village Shek Mun Kap (Tung Chung) for election of resident representative (2019 to 2022)
 Antiquities Advisory Board. Historic Building Appraisal. Entrance Gate, Shek Mun Kap Pictures

Villages in Islands District, Hong Kong
Tung Chung